Chng Hee Kok was a Member of the 6th, 7th 8th and 9th Parliaments of Singapore, where he has been in Radin Mas from 1984 to 1988, Tiong Bahru GRC (Radin Mas) from 1988 to 1991, Tampines GRC (Changkat South) from 1991 to 1997 and East Coast GRC (Fengshan) from 1997 to 2001.

Chng studied in National University of Singapore.

References

Living people
People's Action Party politicians
Singaporean people of Teochew descent
Year of birth missing (living people)
Members of the Parliament of Singapore